The discography of German dance band R.I.O. consists of three studio albums, seventeen singles and two singles as a featured artist.

Albums

Studio albums

Compilation albums

Singles

As lead artist

Remixes

References

Pop music discographies
Discographies of German artists